Machang (Kelantanese: Mache, Jawi: ماچڠ) is one of the ten districts in the state of Kelantan, Malaysia. It is situated at the centre of the state, bordering with Kelantanese territories of Kota Bharu to the north, Pasir Puteh to the east,Terengganu 
State to the southeast, Tanah Merah to the west and Kuala Krai to the south.  Its major town and administrative centre is Machang town.

History
Previously part of Ulu Kelantan, around 1949, Machang was delineated as an autonomous sub-district of Kelantan. Owing to its rapid pace of development and active economic sector, Machang was upgraded as a full District on January 1, 1952. The territory is still largely agrarian, home to a lot of paddy fields, palm and rubber plantations.

Attractions
Among the attractions that get frequented a lot in Machang District are the hot springs that are situated in Kampung Rengas Tok Bok, Hutan Lipur Bukit Bakar, Air Terjun Jeram Linang and Hutan Lipur Cabang Tongkat.

Educational Institution 
The district is the host for the Universiti Teknologi Mara (Machang Branch), 9 national secondary schools, 1 fully residential school, 3 State-Funded Islamic religious school and 20 national primary schools which include a Chinese vernacular national type primary school.

University 
 Universiti Teknologi Mara Machang (UiTM)

Secondary Education

National Schools 
 Sekolah Menengah Kebangsaan Machang
 Sekolah Menengah Kebangsaan Hamzah 1
 Sekolah Menengah Kebangsaan Hamzah 2
 Sekolah Menengah Kebangsaan Bandar Machang
 Sekolah Menengah Kebangsaan Abdul Samad
 Sekolah Menengah Kebangsan Agama Wataniah Machang
 Sekolah Menengah Kebangsaan Sri Intan
 Sekolah Menengah Kebangsaan Temangan
 Sekolah Menengah Kebangsaan Pangkal Meleret

Fully Residential School 
 Sekolah Menengah Sains Machang

State Funded Islamic Religious School 
 Maahad Tahfiz Al Quran Wal Qiraat
 Maahad Syamsul Maarif Lelaki
 Maahad Syamsul Maarif Perempuan

Primary Education

National Schools 
 Sekolah Kebangsaan Ayer Merah
 Sekolah Kebangsaan Bandar
 Sekolah Kebangsaan Bukit Tiu
 Sekolah Kebangsaan Belukar
 Sekolah Kebangsaan Dewan Besar
 Sekolah Kebangsaan Hamzah (1)
 Sekolah Kebangsaan Hamzah (2)
 Sekolah Kebangsaan Kampung Pek
 Sekolah Kebangsaan Labok
 Sekolah Kebangsaan Machang (1)
 Sekolah Kebangsaan Machang (2)
 Sekolah Kebangsaan Mata Ayer
 Sekolah Kebangsaan Pulai Chondong
 Sekolah Kebangsaan Pak Roman
 Sekolah Kebangsaan Pangkal Gong
 Sekolah Kebangsaan Pangkal Meleret
 Sekolah Kebangsaan Pangkal Nering
 Sekolah Kebangsaan Pangkal Jenereh
 Sekolah Kebangsaan Pulai Chondong
 Sekolah Kebangsaan Temangan
 Sekolah Kebangsaan Tok Bok

National School (Chinese Vernacular) 
 Sekolah Jenis Kebangsaan (C) Pei Hwa

Demographics

As of 2010, Machang has a population of 92,149 people.

Ranking Population of Jajahan Machang.

Federal Parliament and State Assembly Seats 

List of LMS district representatives in the Federal Parliament (Dewan Rakyat)

List of LMS district representatives in the State Legislative Assembly of Kelantan

Transportation
Highways 4 and 8 intersect in Machang.

KTM Intercity does not serve Machang town; however there is a railway halt in Temangan town about 10 km from Machang town centre. The halt is the only railway station operating in the Machang constituency.

References

External links